}}

|avg_attendance      = 8,750
|TV                  = 
|biggest_home_win    =  Wigan Warriors 60–0  Wakefield Trinity  
|biggest_away_win    =  Hull FC 14–60  Salford Red Devils  
|matches             = 29
|points              = {{formatnum: {{#expr:

 +42+10+24+38+10+20+27+18+32+30

 +10+24+16+26+18+22+60+0+14+6+6+24

 +36+20+38+6+0+8+0+36+24+25+25+30

 +10+18+36+6+10+18+26+0+20+12+14+60

 +14+8+12+14+20+12+38+20+26+12+14+13}}}}

|league_leaders      = 
|league_leaders_name = League Leaders Shield
|season              = 2023 season
|season_champs       = 
|season_champ_name   = Champions
|second_place        = 
|MVP                 = 
|MVP_link            = Man of Steel AwardsMan of Steel
|top_scorer          =   

Top goal scorer:   Stefan Ratchford  
|top try scorer =  Tom Johnstone   Liam Marshall (8 tries each)
|promote         = 
|promote_from    = Championship
|relegate        = 
|relegate_to     = 
|prevseason_link     = Super League XXVII
|prevseason_year     = 2022
|nextseason_link     = Super League XXVIV
|nextseason_year     = 2024
}}
Super League XXVIII, known as the Betfred Super League XXVIII for sponsorship reasons, is the 28th season of the Super League and 128th season of rugby league in Great Britain.

The season began on 16 February 2023, and will end with the Grand Final on 14 October 2023.

St Helens are the reigning champions going into Super League XXVIII,  winning their 4th successive title, beating Leeds Rhinos in the 2022 Grand Final.

Following Toulouse's relegation from Super League, Leigh Leopards (who were replaced by Toulouse), were immediately promoted back to Super League, after they beat Batley Bulldogs 44–12 in the 2022 Million Pound Game,  losing only one game all season against Featherstone Rovers.

Teams

The league comprises 12 teams.  The regular season comprises 27 rounds.

Table

Fixtures and results

Golden point extra time
If a match ends in a draw after 80 minutes, then a further 10 minutes of golden point extra time is played, to determine a winner (five minutes each way). The first team to score either a try, penalty goal or drop goal during this period, will win the match. However, if there are no further scores during the additional 10 minutes period, then the match will end in a draw.

Game 1 (Salford Red Devils v Wakefield Trinity) 
The round 5 game between Salford Red Devils and Wakefield Trinity on 19 March 2023, finished 13-all after 80 minutes. The game then went to extra time, which saw numerous drop goal attempts by both teams. Salford won the match 14-13 with a drop goal from Marc Sneyd.

Player statistics

Top 10 try scorers

Top 10 goal scorers

Top 10 points scorers

Discipline

Red cards

Yellow cards

Attendances

Club attendances

Top 10 attendances

Broadcasting

References

Super League XXVIII
Current rugby league seasons